The 1924–25 season was Manchester City F.C.'s thirty-fourth season of league football, and eleventh consecutive season in the Football League First Division, excluding the four years during the First World War in which no competitive football was played.

The season was the first season for twelve years in which then-longest serving manager Ernest Mangnall was not at the helm of the club. In his place David Ashworth was appointed as manager.

Team Kit

Football League First Division

Results summary

Reports

FA Cup

Squad statistics

Squad
Appearances for competitive matches only

Scorers

See also
Manchester City F.C. seasons

References

External links
Extensive Manchester City statistics site

Manchester City F.C. seasons
Manchester City F.C.